Saint Liphardus (or Lifard, Lifardo, Lifardus, Lifart, Lifhard, Lifhart, Liphard, Liphart, Lyphard) was a 6th-century lawyer, hermit and abbot in Meung-sur-Loire near Orléans, France.
His feast day is 3 June.

Guyon's Life
Symphorien Guyon (died 1657) in his Histoire de l'Eglise et diocèse, ville, et université d'Orléans tells that Liphard was born in Orléans, the son of Rigomert, prince of the city of Le Mans, and a close relative of King Clovis I.
His younger brother was Saint Leonard.
Liphard studied literature and the law as a young man, and because of his capability and his noble birth he was appointed a governor and judge in Orléans.
However, around the age of 40 he became tired of the worldly life, left his job and was ordained a deacon.
Soon after he entered the monastery of Saint Mesmin, while his brother Leonard went to Aquitaine.
Liphard, accompanied by a disciple named Urbice, then withdrew to a place named Meun [Meung-sur-Loire], four leagues from Orléans, where there was an old chateau that had been ruined by the Huns and Vandals during the wars with Attila.
In this solitary place Liphard built a small cell, where he lived an austere life of contemplation.
The bishop of Orléans heard of Liphard's virtue and perfection, and made him a priest so he could teach others.
Liphard continued his studies in his lonely cell.

Nearby there was a furious serpent or dragon that terrified all the people of the neighborhood, crawling or rolling near the fountain where they used to draw water.
Only Liphard and his disciple Urbice dared go near the fountain.
One day Liphard saw in a vision that the dragon was coming towards his cell to do harm.
Liphard sent Urbice to the place where he knew he would meet the dragon.
Urbice went there, unsuspecting, but when he saw the dragon coming towards him he fled back to Liphard in panic.
Liphard smiled, blamed him for having too little faith, gave him a rod and told him to plant it before the furious beast.
Urbice did as he was told, while Liphard prayed to God to kill the dragon.
When the dragon saw the rod he tried to break it and shake it to pieces, but instead hung himself from the rod and died.
A legion of devils who were living in the dragon came out howling and crying that they had been driven from their home.
The peasants of the neighborhood heard the clamour and were afraid that the dragon had hurt Liphard, but when the arrived they found him making his ordinary prayers while the dragon lay dead beside him.

Later, with his disciple Saint Urbice, Liphard founded the monastery of Meung-sur-Loire, of which he became abbot.
After his death Urbice succeeded him as abbot.

Monks of Ramsgate account

The monks of St Augustine's Abbey, Ramsgate wrote in their Book of Saints (1921),

Butler's account
 
The hagiographer Alban Butler (1710–1773) wrote in his Lives of the Fathers, Martyrs, and Other Principal Saints under June 3,

Notes

Citations

Sources

 

 

6th-century Frankish saints
6th-century deaths